"Not Ready to Go" is a song by Canadian rock band The Trews. It was released in 2003 as the second single from their debut album, House of Ill Fame. The song was the first song by an independent band to reach #1 in Canadian radio chart history. It was the most played song on Canadian Rock Radio in 2004.

Chart positions

Awards and nominations
It was nominated for "Single of the Year" at the 2005 Juno Awards, although it lost to K-os' song "Crabbuckit". It also received a nomination for "Single of the Year" at the 2005 East Coast Music Awards, and lost to "Sunburn" by Gordie Sampson, however, the group won the award for "Group of the Year".

References

External links

2004 singles
The Trews songs
2003 songs
Epic Records singles
Songs written by Gordie Johnson